Sarah Hilary is a UK crime novelist and former bookseller. Hilary was born in Cheshire but later moved to the South East to study for a First Class Honours Degree in History of Ideas. She won the Fish Criminally Short Histories Prize in 2008 for her story, Fall River, in August 1892. In 2012, she was awarded the Cheshire Prize for Literature.

Her debut novel, Someone Else's Skin, was published in 2014 and was a Richard & Judy Book Club pick in the same year. It won the 2015 Theakston's Old Peculier Crime Novel of the Year Award, and, in 2016, it was selected as one of the titles for World Book Night in the UK. It has also been a Silver Falchion and Macavity Award finalist in the US.

Her second book, No Other Darkness, was shortlisted for a Barry Award.

Hilary has written about her family history, most notably in My Mother was Emperor Hirohito's Poster Child for The Guardian, March 2014. Her mother and grandparents were prisoners of the Japanese in Batu Lintang camp where her grandfather, Stanley George Hill, died in 1945. Hilary wrote about her grandmother's courage in the camp for the Dangerous Women Project in 2017.

She wrote the introduction for Virago's new editions of three books by Patricia Highsmith republished in 2016: The Two Faces of January, This Sweet Sickness, and People Who Knock on the Door. Hilary talks about Highsmith's legacy for today's crime writers in A Gift for Killing, June 2016.

Her first standalone, Fragile, published on 10 June 2021, is partly inspired by the motives of Daphne du Maurier's Rebecca.

Works

Marnie Rome series

References 

Living people
21st-century English novelists
English crime fiction writers
English crime writers
English thriller writers
English mystery writers
Year of birth missing (living people)
People on the autism spectrum